Eibhlin Byrne is a former Fianna Fáil politician who served as Lord Mayor of Dublin from 2008 to 2009.

Byrne has held a number of senior positions including (current) Acting Director of the Daughters of Charity Child and Family Service, Head of Communication and Advocacy at Depaul Trust (Homeless Service) (2003–2006), and Chair of the National Council on Ageing and Older People. She has also worked as a volunteer with the SATU (Sexual Assault Treatment Unit) team from  Dublin Rape Crisis Centre. She became Chairperson of Dublin Rape Crisis Centre in 2010.

Byrne began her career as a secondary school teacher and also ran language programmes between Irish students and young people in France, Germany, Spain and Italy.

She was a member of the Dublin City Council for the Clontarf area from 2003–09 when she was co-opted to replace Sandra Geraghty. She was re-elected in June 2004 for a five-year term. She was elected as Lord Mayor in 2008 by Fianna Fáil councillors with the support of councillors from the Labour Party, Sinn Féin and several Independents. Byrne was previously a member of the City Council's Housing Strategic Policy Group, the Dublin Regional Authority,  and the Dublin Bay Task Force. She was also a member of Commissions on Crime and on Ageing in the City.

On 15 April 2009, Byrne was nominated as a Fianna Fáil candidate (along with Eoin Ryan) for the Dublin constituency at the 2009 European Parliament election which was held on 5 June 2009 but she was not elected. Byrne did not stand for re-election to Dublin City Council. She resigned from Fianna Fáil in 2011.  She continued to work for community regeneration as Chairperson of Fatima Regeneration Board.  She also served as a board member of Holocaust Education Board, promoting anti-racism and the learning of lessons from World War II.

In a personal capacity until 2009 Byrne was a board member of Console. She was chairperson of the visiting committee for Dóchas Centre women's prison, at Mountjoy, Dublin, until her term ended in 2011. She continued to promote a more socially and family productive approach to the imprisonment of women.

In 2009, Byrne drew criticism when she suggested it was "unpatriotic" for the Republic's citizens to go shopping in Northern Ireland. Her comments were denounced as "partitionist" by Sinn Féin's Martin McGuinness.

References

 

Living people
Year of birth missing (living people)
Fianna Fáil politicians
Lord Mayors of Dublin
Women mayors of places in Ireland
Irish schoolteachers
Alumni of University College Dublin